The Cloverfield Paradox is a 2018 American science fiction horror film directed by Julius Onah and written by Oren Uziel, from a story by Uziel and Doug Jung, and produced by J. J. Abramss Bad Robot Productions. It is the third film in the Cloverfield franchise, following Cloverfield (2008) and 10 Cloverfield Lane (2016). It stars Daniel Brühl, Elizabeth Debicki, Aksel Hennie, Gugu Mbatha-Raw, Chris O'Dowd, John Ortiz, David Oyelowo, and Zhang Ziyi. It follows an international group of astronauts aboard a space station who, after using a particle accelerator to try to solve Earth's energy crisis, must find a way home when the planet seemingly vanishes.

The film is based on God Particle, a spec script from Oren Uziel, which had the main plot of the space-station crew but was unconnected to Cloverfield. The script was acquired by Paramount Pictures and Bad Robot in 2012. It was planned as part of Paramount's low-budget InSurge distribution label but, following the folding of that label, its production was expanded as a Paramount-distributed film. Only during production did Abrams decide to link the film to Cloverfield, adapting Uziel's screenplay and adding scenes to establish the connection, after the same approach was used to alter 10 Cloverfield Lane from its original script, The Cellar. Abrams saw the particle accelerator accident as a cinematic means for future events to cause changes in the past, narratively linking the Cloverfield franchise together.

Once announced as a yet-to-be-named Cloverfield film in late 2016, the film's release was delayed several times. A surprise trailer aired during Super Bowl LII on February 4, 2018, advertising the film's final title and its release on Netflix, which had purchased rights for the film from Paramount. The release occurred immediately after the game. While the unique marketing tactics were praised, the film itself received generally negative reviews, with many considering it the weakest of the Cloverfield films.

Plot
In 2018, Earth is suffering from a global energy crisis. The space agencies of the world prepare to test the Shepard particle accelerator aboard the orbiting Cloverfield Station, which would provide Earth with infinite energy, while conspiracy theorists fear it will create the "Cloverfield Paradox", opening portals to parallel universes allowing their horrors to threaten Earth. Among the crew is Ava Hamilton, a British engineer who frets about leaving her husband Michael potentially for years, as their relationship struggles since the loss of their children to a house fire. The crew is rounded out by American commander Kiel, German physicist Ernst Schmidt, Brazilian medical doctor Monk Acosta, Irish engineer Mundy, Russian engineer Volkov, and Chinese engineer Tam.

After about two years of unsuccessful attempts to activate the Shepard, the crew achieves a seemingly stable beam, but it overloads and creates a power surge on the station. After restoring basic power, they find that Earth has vanished from view, and the gyroscope that aids in the station's navigation is missing. As the crew works on repairs, strange events begin to occur, including the discovery (and subsequent rescue) of an unfamiliar woman called Mina Jensen fused with wires inside a wall. Volkov's eyeballs begin moving of their own accord; he begins conversing with his own reflection in a mirror and is compelled to craft a gun using an on-board 3D printer. He uses the gun to threaten the crew, but as he does so he convulses and dies, and the station's worm colony bursts out of him. Jensen tells Hamilton not to trust Schmidt, who Jensen claims to be a spy sent by the German government to keep the Shepard shut down. Mundy's arm gets pulled into a solid wall and is severed clean off, without bleeding or pain. They find the arm roaming of its own volition. When they recognize it is trying to write something, it instructs them to "cut Volkov open". Once they do, they find the missing gyroscope. They finally locate Earth and begin restoring their communications, but transmissions state the station was destroyed and fell to Earth two days prior.

The crew determine the particle beam overload has activated the Cloverfield Paradox, which is the cause of the strange events, and also moved the station to a parallel universe in which Jensen replaced Tam as the station's engineer, Schmidt is a spy, and Hamilton, (though still working on the mission), has remained on Earth, where her children are still alive. Believing the Paradox can be reversed and they can return to their own universe if they reactivate the Shepard, the crew starts making repairs. Tam is trapped in a chamber that floods with water, and then explodes, freezing the water and Tam. Meanwhile, Hamilton decides to return to parallel Earth with Jensen in order to prevent the fire that killed her children. As they prepare, Mundy is killed in an explosion caused by a strange magnetic field, destabilizing part of the Shepard and threatening to tear the whole station apart. Kiel sacrifices himself to save the station, leaving Hamilton in charge.

On Earth, Michael has woken up to discover a wave of destruction ravaging the planet, witnessing the silhouette of a giant monster in the distance. On his way to offer assistance at the local hospital, he stops to help a young girl named Molly at a dockyard. After finding the hospital was destroyed, he takes her to the underground shelter of a friend and tends to her wounds.

With the Shepard particle accelerator ready to activate again, Hamilton prepares to leave with Jensen, but Jensen suddenly knocks her out. Jensen kills Monk with Volkov's gun, wounds Schmidt, and insists the station must stay in her universe to keep the Shepard particle accelerator there. Regaining consciousness, Hamilton uses the gun to shoot out a window, ejecting Jensen into space. Hamilton decides to return to their universe with Schmidt and makes a recording she sends to her alternate universe self, with the plans for the Shepard and in which she stresses of the importance of her family. Hamilton and Schmidt reverse the universe shift and use Tam's modifications to finally make the Shepard work. After reporting in, the two eject themselves in an evacuation capsule towards Earth.

Michael learns from mission control of the station's reappearance and his wife's return to Earth, but he lambasts them for returning to Earth in light of the ongoing situation. As the capsule re-enters the Earth's atmosphere, a giant monster bursts through the top of a cloud layer, letting out a roar.

Cast

 Gugu Mbatha-Raw as Ava Hamilton, the British communications officer aboard Cloverfield Station and Michael's wife.
 David Oyelowo as Jason Kiel, the American commander of the station.
 Daniel Brühl as Ernst Schmidt, a German physicist.
 John Ortiz as Monk Acosta, a Brazilian doctor.
 Chris O'Dowd as Gordon Mundy, an Irish engineer.
 Aksel Hennie as Sasha Volkov, a Russian engineer.
 Zhang Ziyi as Ling Tam, a Chinese engineer.
 Elizabeth Debicki as Mina Jensen, an Australian engineer from one of the alternate timelines.
 Roger Davies as Michael Hamilton, Ava's husband.
 Clover Nee as Molly, a young girl rescued by Michael.

Additionally, Donal Logue cameos as Mark Stambler, a conspiracy theorist discussing the "Cloverfield Paradox", the brother of Howard Stambler who was the conspiracy theorist portrayed by John Goodman in 10 Cloverfield Lane. Suzanne Cryer, who appeared as Leslie in 10 Cloverfield Lane, also appears in a brief cameo role as a newscaster who interviews Stambler. Simon Pegg and Greg Grunberg, both of whom have frequently worked with Abrams on other films and television series, provide vocal cameos as Radio Voice and Joe, respectively. Oyelowo and Logue previously portrayed Kiel and Stambler in the film's ARG campaign.

Production

Pre-production
The film was announced in November 2012, under the title God Particle, based on a script by Oren Uziel and to be directed by Julius Onah. With J.J. Abrams' Bad Robot Productions as the production studio, it was set to be released under Paramount's InSurge label, limiting the film's budget to $5–10 million. At this stage, the film was established to take place on a space station in Earth's orbit and a resulting incident that causes the crew to find Earth has gone missing. Uziel said that his script had been a spec script he wrote about one year after finishing up a similar spec script for Shimmer Lake. The pick-up of the film occurred around the same time that Paramount and Bad Robot bought the rights to the spec script The Cellar by Josh Campbell and Matt Stuecken, which ultimately was reworked during production to become 10 Cloverfield Lane (2016), adding in elements to tie that script to the first Cloverfield film; however, when Uziel wrote his screenplay for God Particle it had not been attached to Cloverfield. When Bad Robot acquired the script, J. J. Abrams had already put some thought for how it could fit into Cloverfield but had not come up with a way prior to filming. Abrams liked that with the script, "how something in the future could be an origin for something in the past" to establish origin stories for the other Cloverfield works. Abrams said that the script had "the DNA" that made it a potential Cloverfield film, and was looking for it to be a spiritual sequel to the original.

In March 2015, Paramount decided to close the InSurge label; The Cellar had been moved under the main Paramount label, but God Particles fate was unclear. By February 2016, Paramount confirmed it would release the film under its own label, with a planned February 2017 release date.

Casting
In March 2016, Gugu Mbatha-Raw and David Oyelowo were confirmed to be cast in the film. In April, Variety reported that John Krasinski was in early talks to join the film to play one of the astronauts, but had a possible conflict due to a commitment with a television series. In May, Elizabeth Debicki, Daniel Brühl, Chris O'Dowd, Zhang Ziyi, John Ortiz, and Aksel Hennie were announced as members of the cast. Cinematographer Dan Mindel was confirmed to join the film from his résumé.

Filming
The film was shot in Los Angeles, California, where it received tax credits under the state's film incentive program. While filming in Los Angeles, the project was shot under the titles of God Particle and Clean Pass. Filming began on June 10, 2016, and wrapped on September 23, 2016. According to Uziel, it was during production that he came to learn that the film was being connected to Cloverfield, requiring him to rewrite a few scenes for additional shooting. Uziel speculated that the decision to connect to Cloverfield was due to the difficulty in marketing a stand-alone science-fiction film at the time, and felt the connection between the films was more of an anthology series similar to The Twilight Zone, with each movie dealing with how people with complex relations deal with an other-worldly dilemma. The scenes set on Earth were added during production only after they found test audiences wanted to know what was happening on Earth during events on the space station. The final shot of the monster, similar to the creature Clover seen in the first Cloverfield movie, was a shot that the production team came to recognize as a further way to link the films. Among some of the film's Easter eggs includes a figurine of a "Slusho!" mascot aboard the station; the drink brand had been featured in Cloverfields viral marketing.

Post-production
The visual effects were provided by Atomic Fiction and supervised by Ryan Tudhope, Russell Earl, Jason Snell, Stefano Trivelli and Pauline Duvall with the help of Industrial Light & Magic and Base FX.

Release
Shortly after filming in October 2016, The Wrap learned from insiders of the connection of God Particle to Cloverfield, though neither Paramount nor Bad Robot commented on this discovery. However, by December 2016, Paramount affirmed the film's connection; the title God Particle had been dropped in favor of listing the film as "2017 Cloverfield movie".

Alongside the renaming, Paramount reslotted the film's release from February 2017 to October 2017, to give more time for post-production. The film suffered two additional delays. In July 2017, it was announced the release had been delayed another three months to February 2018. In January 2018, the release was moved for a third time, to April 20, 2018. The reason for these latter delays was not given.

In mid-January 2018, the Cloverfield alternative reality game (ARG), which had been used for both of the previous films, was relaunched, and provided some hints how this film would be tied to the other two.

In late January 2018, The Hollywood Reporter stated that Netflix was interested in picking up the film from Paramount, following a similar deal the streaming service had worked out for the film Annihilation. According to the Reporter, Paramount's chairman Jim Gianopulos felt the film's budget (which had ballooned to over $40 million from an initial $5 million) was too large for the film to be profitable with a traditional theatrical release and that it still needed work done, and "while Abrams expressed an intent to get down to business in post-production, it was too little, too late". In March 2018, Paramount's COO Andrew Gumpert affirmed that Paramount, after reviewing the finished film with Abrams, had doubted the commercial viability of a theatrical release, and that "there was an ability for us to be fiscally prudent and monetize" by selling the rights to Netflix, exposing the film to a much larger audience. The studio retains China and home entertainment release rights. According insiders speaking to The Wrap, Paramount executives believed handing off the release to Netflix was an easy way to get instant return on the film, and the surprise reveal and release a good way to keep in line with the mystique of the franchise. This said, they clarified that they still have intentions of having theatrical releases for future films in the series.

Around this time, speculation of the film being named Cloverfield Station arose, though this was not confirmed by Paramount. Further speculation circulated in Hollywood sources that work on the film was actually complete and that its first trailer would be revealed soon; 10 Cloverfield Lane had a similar surprise trailer.

The events of the preceding month culminated on February 4, 2018, where, during a surprise advertisement during Super Bowl LII, Netflix announced it had acquired the premiere rights for the film, now titled The Cloverfield Paradox, which would be available on the service immediately after the game. The actors themselves were not aware of this arrangement until the day of the Super Bowl and were told of the title, the advertisement, and the release that day during a morning conference call.

Home media
On November 28, 2018, Paramount announced that the film would be receiving a DVD and Blu-ray release on February 5, 2019.

Reception

Critical response 
  

John DeFire of The Hollywood Reporter called the film a "trainwreck of a sci-fi flick bent on extending a franchise that should have died a peaceful death almost exactly one decade ago." Writing for Deadline Hollywood Dino-Ray Ramos said, "The Super Bowl trailer for Paradox gave the impression the movie would reveal the origin of the monster that appeared in the 2008 movie and was later on hinted at in the critically acclaimed 2016 follow-up — but it barely did that. Instead, it stalls the franchise as a pastiche of sci-fi cinema veiled in clever marketing."

Cinemablend gave it a positive review, granting it 4 of 5 stars; the review noted that the ensemble cast "helps keep the wheels in motion, with a perpetual motion that never lets up", and that Ava's storyline provides a "human anchor" for the film's narrative.

Audience viewership 
While the film received negative reviews, the marketing approach of announcing the film during the Super Bowl and premiering it hours later was seen as a novel move by Netflix. IGN noted that this strategy could only work for a film in an established franchise, whereas most new films would need a significant marketing period to draw in viewers. Even knowing that the film might be a critical flop, Netflix would have been able to grab attention due to hype from the Super Bowl, and attention that the Cloverfield series had already had.

According to Nielsen ratings based on subscription video on demand, nearly 785,000 viewers watched The Cloverfield Paradox on the night of Super Bowl LII; by three days, over 2.8 million had watched it, and 5 million after a week. These ratings were not as strong as Netflix's Bright, released 6 weeks earlier, which had 11 million viewers within 3 days. The film did not significantly draw viewers from the episode of This is Us on NBC after the Super Bowl game, which had been extensively marketed ahead of the night, and which drew 27 million that evening.

Future 
In February 2018, Abrams acknowledged potential for character crossovers in future films. The producer confirmed plans for an eventual team-up with Ava and Mary Elizabeth Winstead's Michelle from 10 Cloverfield Lane.
In June 2018, Abrams revealed a fourth film that would serve as a "true" and "dedicated" sequel to Cloverfield. In January 2021, Joe Barton was hired as screenwriter, while Abrams will co-produce the film with Hannah Minghella. The project will be a joint-venture production between Bad Robot Productions and Paramount Pictures and will receive a theatrical release. In January 2023, Matt Reeves stated that the ongoing developments won't be talked about prior to future project releases, with intent for it to "always [be] surprising" similar to the previous installments.

See also
 List of films featuring space stations

References

External links
 
 
 
 

2018 horror films
2018 horror thriller films
2010s science fiction horror films
2010s monster movies
American horror thriller films
American science fiction horror films
American science fiction thriller films
American body horror films
Cloverfield (franchise)
2010s English-language films
Films about astronauts
Films about scientists
Films directed by Julius Onah
Films produced by J. J. Abrams
Films set in 2028
Films shot in Los Angeles
Films about parallel universes
IMAX films
Bad Robot Productions films
Paramount Pictures films
English-language Netflix original films
Films scored by Bear McCreary
Films with screenplays by Oren Uziel
2010s American films